Mediterranea amaltheae is a species of small air-breathing land snail, a terrestrial pulmonate gastropod mollusk in the family Oxychilidae, the glass snails. 

This species is endemic to Greece and was found on Crete.

References

 Bank, R. A.; Neubert, E. (2017). Checklist of the land and freshwater Gastropoda of Europe. Last update: July 16th, 2017

Mediterranea
Endemic fauna of Greece
Gastropods described in 1982